Wake Island (also known as Wake Atoll) is a coral atoll in the western Pacific Ocean in the northeastern area of the Micronesia subregion,  east of Guam,  west of Honolulu,  southeast of Tokyo and  north of Majuro. The island is an unorganized unincorporated territory belonging to (but not a part of) the United States. Wake Island is also claimed by the Republic of the Marshall Islands based on oral legends dating back centuries. However, the United States does not recognize this claim. Wake Island is one of the most isolated islands in the world. The nearest inhabited island is Utirik Atoll in the Marshall Islands,  to the southeast.

The United States took possession of Wake Island in 1899. One of 14 U.S. insular areas, Wake Island is administered by the United States Air Force under an agreement with the U.S. Department of the Interior. The center of activity on the atoll is at Wake Island Airfield, which is primarily used as a mid-Pacific refueling stop for military aircraft and as an emergency landing area. The  runway is the longest strategic runway in the Pacific islands. South of the runway is the Wake Island Launch Center, a missile launch site. The island has no permanent inhabitants, but approximately 100 people live there at any given time.

On December 8, 1941 (within a few hours of the attack on Pearl Harbor, Wake Island being on the opposite side of the International Date Line), American forces on Wake Island were attacked by Japanese bombers. This action marked the commencement of the Battle of Wake Island. On December 11, 1941, Wake Island was the site of the Japanese Empire's first unsuccessful amphibious attack on U.S. territory in World War II when U.S. Marines, with some U.S. Navy personnel and civilians on the island, repelled an attempted Japanese invasion. The island fell to overwhelming Japanese forces 12 days later; it remained occupied by Japanese forces until it was surrendered to the U.S. in September 1945 at the end of the war.

The submerged and emergent lands at Wake Island comprise a unit of the Pacific Remote Islands Marine National Monument. Wake Island is one of nine insular areas that comprise the United States Minor Outlying Islands, a statistical designation defined by the International Organization for Standardization's ISO 3166-1 code.

Etymology
Wake Island derives its name from British sea captain Samuel Wake, who rediscovered the atoll in 1796 while in command of the Prince William Henry. The name is sometimes attributed to Captain William Wake, who also is reported to have discovered the atoll from the Prince William Henry in 1792.

Geography

Wake is located two-thirds of the way from Honolulu to Guam. The atoll is to the west of the International Date Line and in the Wake Island Time Zone (UTC+12), the easternmost time zone in the United States and almost one day ahead of the 50 states.

Although Wake is officially called an island in the singular form, it is geologically an atoll composed of three islets (Wake, Wilkes, and Peale islets) and a reef surrounding a central lagoon.

Climate
Wake Island lies in the tropical zone, but is subject to periodic temperate storms during the winter. Sea surface temperatures are warm all year long, reaching above  in summer and autumn. Typhoons occasionally pass over the island.

Typhoons

On October 19, 1940, an unnamed typhoon hit Wake Island with  winds. This was the first recorded typhoon to hit the island since observations began in 1935.

Super Typhoon Olive impacted Wake on September 16, 1952, with wind speeds reaching . Olive caused major flooding, destroyed approximately 85% of its structures and caused  in damage.

On September 16, 1967, at 10:40 pm local time, the eye of Super Typhoon Sarah passed over the island. All non-reinforced structures were demolished. There were no serious injuries, and the majority of the civilian population was evacuated after the storm.

On August 28, 2006, the United States Air Force evacuated all 188 residents and suspended all operations as Category 5 Super Typhoon Ioke headed toward Wake. A U.S. Air Force assessment and repair team returned to the island in September 2006 and restored limited function to the airfield and facilities leading ultimately to a full return to normal operations.

Ecology

Wake Island is home to the Wake Atoll National Wildlife Refuge.

Native vegetation communities of Wake Island include scrub, grass, and wetlands. Tournefortia argentia dominated scrublands exist in association with Scaevola taccada, Cordia subcordata, and Pisonia grandis. Grassland species include Dactyloctenium aegyptium and Tribulus cistoides. Wetlands are dominated by Sesuvium portulacastrum, and Pemphis acidula is found near intertidal lagoons.

The atoll is home to multiple species of land crabs, with Coenobita perlatus being especially abundant.

The atoll, with its surrounding marine waters, has been recognized as an Important Bird Area (IBA) by BirdLife International for its sooty tern colony, with some 200,000 individual birds estimated in 1999. 56 bird species have been sighted on the atoll.

Due to human use, several invasive species have become established on the atoll. Feral cats were introduced in the 1960s as pets and for pest control. Eradication efforts began in earnest in 1996, and were deemed successful in 2008. Two species of rat, Rattus exulans and Rattus tanezumi, have colonized the island. R. tanezumi populations were successfully eradicated by 2014, however, R. exulans persists. Casuarina equisetifolia was planted on Wake Island by boy scouts in the 1960s for use as a windbreak. It formed large mono-cultural forests that choked out native vegetation. Concerted efforts to kill the populations began in 2017. Other introduced plant species include Cynodon dactylon and Leucaena leucocephala. Non-native species of ants are also found on the atoll.

History

Prehistory
The presence of the Polynesian rat on the island suggests that Wake was likely visited by Polynesian or Micronesian voyagers at an early date.

Early European contact
The first recorded discovery of Wake Island was on October 2, 1568, by Spanish explorer and navigator Álvaro de Mendaña de Neyra. In 1567, Mendaña and his crew had set off on two ships, Los Reyes and Todos los Santos, from Callao, Peru, on an expedition to search for a gold-rich land in the South Pacific as mentioned in Inca tradition. After visiting Tuvalu and the Solomon Islands, the expedition headed north and came upon Wake Island, "a low barren island, judged to be eight leagues in circumference". Since the date – October 2, 1568 – was the eve of the feast of Saint Francis of Assisi, the captain named it St Francis Island. The ships were in need of water and the crew was suffering from scurvy, but after circling the island it was determined that Wake was waterless and had "not a cocoanut nor a pandanus" and, in fact, "there was nothing on it but sea-birds, and sandy places covered with bushes." (It was while attempting to relocate Wake according to Mendaña's description of its coordinates that James Cook first reached the Hawaiian Islands.)

In 1796, Captain Samuel Wake of the merchantman Prince William Henry also came upon Wake Island, naming the atoll for himself. Soon thereafter the 80-ton fur trading merchant brig Halcyon arrived at Wake and Master Charles William Barkley, unaware of Captain Wake's visit and other prior European contact, named the atoll Halcyon Island in honor of his ship.

The island was "covered with wood, having a very green and rural appearance". This report is considered to be another sighting of Wake Island.

United States Exploring Expedition

Wilkes described the atoll as "a low coral one, of triangular form and eight feet above the surface. It has a large lagoon in the centre, which was well filled with fish of a variety of species among these were some fine mullet." He also noted that Wake had no fresh water but was covered with shrubs, "the most abundant of which was the tournefortia." The expedition's naturalist, Titian Peale, noted that "the only remarkable part in the formation of this island is the enormous blocks of coral which have been thrown up by the violence of the sea". Peale collected an egg from a short-tailed albatross and added other specimens, including a Polynesian rat, to the natural history collections of the expedition. Wilkes also reported that "from appearances, the island must be at times submerged, or the sea makes a complete breach over it".

Wreck and salvage of Libelle
Wake Island first received international attention with the wreck of the barque . On the night of March 4, 1866, the 650-ton iron-hulled Libelle, of Bremen, struck the eastern reef of Wake Island during a gale. Commanded by Captain Anton Tobias, the ship was en route from San Francisco to Hong Kong with a cargo of mercury (quicksilver). After three days of searching and digging on the island for water, the crew was able to recover a  water tank from the wrecked ship. Valuable cargo was also recovered and buried on the island, including some of the 1,000 flasks of mercury, as well as coins and precious stones valued at $93,943. After three weeks with a dwindling water supply and no sign of rescue, the passengers and crew decided to leave Wake and attempt to sail to Guam (the center of the then Spanish colony of the Mariana Islands) on the two remaining boats from Libelle. The 22 passengers and some of the crew sailed in the  longboat under the command of First Mate Rudolf Kausch and the remainder of the crew sailed with Captain Tobias in the  gig. On April 8, 1866, after 13 days of frequent squalls, short rations and tropical sun, the longboat reached Guam. Unfortunately, the gig, commanded by the captain, was lost at sea.

The Spanish governor of the Mariana Islands, Francisco Moscoso y Lara, welcomed and provided aid to the Libelle shipwreck survivors on Guam. He also ordered the schooner Ana, owned and commanded by his son-in-law George H. Johnston, to be dispatched with first mate Kausch to search for the missing gig and then sail on to Wake Island to confirm the shipwreck story and recover the buried treasure. Ana departed Guam on April 10 and, after two days at Wake Island, found and salvaged the buried coins and precious stones as well as a small quantity of the quicksilver.

Wreck of Dashing Wave
On July 29, 1870, the British tea clipper Dashing Wave, under the command of Captain Henry Vandervord, sailed out of Fuzhou, China, en route to Sydney. On August 31 "the weather was very thick, and it was blowing a heavy gale from the eastward, attended with violent squalls, and a tremendous sea." At 10:30 p.m. breakers were seen and the ship struck the reef at Wake Island. Overnight the vessel began to break up and at 10:00 a.m. the crew succeeded in launching the longboat over the leeward side. In the chaos of the evacuation, the captain secured a chart and nautical instruments, but no compass. The crew loaded a case of wine, some bread and two buckets, but no drinking water. Since Wake Island appeared to have neither food nor water, the captain and his 12-man crew quickly departed, crafting a makeshift sail by attaching a blanket to an oar. With no water, each man was allotted a glass of wine per day until a heavy rain shower came on the sixth day. After 31 days of hardship, drifting westward in the longboat, they reached Kosrae (Strong's Island) in the Caroline Islands. Captain Vandervord attributed the loss of Dashing Wave to the erroneous manner in which Wake Island "is laid down in the charts. It is very low, and not easily seen even on a clear night."

American possession
With the annexation of Hawaii in 1898 and the acquisition of Guam and the Philippines resulting from the conclusion of the Spanish–American War that same year, the United States began to consider unclaimed and uninhabited Wake Island, located approximately halfway between Honolulu and Manila, as a good location for a telegraph cable station and coaling station for refueling warships of the rapidly expanding United States Navy and passing merchant and passenger steamships. On July 4, 1898, United States Army Brigadier General Francis V. Greene of the 2nd Brigade, Philippine Expeditionary Force, of the Eighth Army Corps, stopped at Wake Island and raised the United States flag while en route to the Philippines on the steamship liner SS China.

On January 17, 1899, under orders from President William McKinley, Commander Edward D. Taussig of  landed on Wake and formally took possession of the island for the United States. After a 21-gun salute, the flag was raised and a brass plate was affixed to the flagstaff with the following inscription:

Rear Admiral Royal Bird Bradford, chief of the U.S. Navy's Bureau of Equipment, stated before the U.S. House of Representatives Committee on Interstate and Foreign Commerce on January 17, 1902, that "Wake Island seems at times to be swept by the sea. It is only a few feet above the level of the ocean, and if a cable station were established there very expensive works would be required; besides it has no harbor, while the Midway Islands are perfectly habitable and have a fair harbor for vessels of  draught."

On June 23, 1902, commanded by Captain Alfred Croskey and bound for Manila, spotted a ship's boat on the beach as it passed closely by Wake Island. Soon thereafter the boat was launched by Japanese on the island and sailed out to meet the transport. The Japanese told Captain Croskey that they had been put on the island by a schooner from Yokohama in Japan and that they were gathering guano and drying fish. The captain suspected that they were also engaged in pearl hunting. The Japanese revealed that one of their parties needed medical attention and the captain determined from their descriptions of the symptoms that the illness was most likely beriberi. They informed Captain Croskey that they did not need any provisions or water and that they were expecting the Japanese schooner to return in a month or so. The Japanese declined an offer to be taken on the transport to Manila and were given some medical supplies for the sick man, some tobacco and a few incidentals.

After USAT Buford reached Manila, Captain Croskey reported on the presence of Japanese at Wake Island. He also learned that USAT Sheridan had a similar encounter at Wake with the Japanese. The incident was brought to the attention of Assistant Secretary of the Navy Charles Darling, who at once informed the State Department and suggested that an explanation from the Japanese Government was needed. In August 1902, Japanese Minister Takahira Kogorō provided a diplomatic note stating that the Japanese Government had "no claim whatever to make on the sovereignty of the island, but that if any subjects are found on the island the Imperial Government expects that they should be properly protected as long as they are engaged in peaceful occupations."

Wake Island was now clearly a territory of the United States, but during this period the island was only occasionally visited by passing American ships.

Feather collecting

With limited fresh water resources, no harbor and no plans for development, Wake Island remained a remote uninhabited Pacific island in the early 20th century. It did, however, have a large seabird population that attracted Japanese feather collecting. The global demand for feathers and plumage was driven by the millinery industry and popular European fashion designs for hats, while other demand came from pillow and bedspread manufacturers. Japanese poachers set up camps to harvest feathers on many remote islands in the Central Pacific. The feather trade was primarily focused on Laysan albatross, black-footed albatross, masked booby, lesser frigatebird, great frigatebird, sooty tern and other species of tern. Although feather collecting and plumage exploitation had been outlawed in the territorial United States, there is no record of any enforcement actions at Wake Island.

Japanese castaways

In January 1908, the Japanese ship Toyoshima Maru, en route from Tateyama, Japan, to the South Pacific, encountered a heavy storm that disabled the ship and swept the captain and five of the crew overboard. The 36 remaining crew members managed to make landfall on Wake Island, where they endured five months of great hardship, disease and starvation. In May 1908, the Brazilian Navy training ship Benjamin Constant, while on a voyage around the world, passed by the island and spotted a tattered red distress flag. Unable to land a boat, the crew executed a challenging three-day rescue operation using rope and cable to bring on board the 20 survivors and transport them to Yokohama.

USS Beaver strategic survey
In his 1921 book Sea-Power in the Pacific: A Study of the American-Japanese Naval Problem, Hector C. Bywater recommended establishing a well-defended fueling station at Wake Island to provide coal and oil for United States Navy ships engaged in future operations against Japan. On June 19, 1922, the submarine tender  landed an investigating party to determine the practicality and feasibility of establishing a naval fueling station on Wake Island. Lt. Cmdr. Sherwood Picking reported that from "a strategic point of view, Wake Island could not be better located, dividing as it does with Midway, the passage from Honolulu to Guam into almost exact thirds." Picking suggested clearing the channel to the lagoon for "loaded motor sailing launches" so that parties on shore could receive supplies from passing ships and he strongly recommended that Wake be used as a base for aircraft. Picking stated that "If the long heralded trans-Pacific flight ever takes place, Wake Island should certainly be occupied and used as an intermediate resting and fueling port."

Tanager Expedition

In 1923, a joint expedition by the then Bureau of the Biological Survey (in the U.S. Department of Agriculture), the Bernice Pauahi Bishop Museum and the United States Navy was organized to conduct a thorough biological reconnaissance of the Northwestern Hawaiian Islands, then administered by the Biological Survey Bureau as the Hawaiian Islands Bird Reservation. On February 1, 1923, Secretary of Agriculture Henry C. Wallace contacted Secretary of Navy Edwin Denby to request Navy participation and recommended expanding the expedition to Johnston, Midway and Wake, all islands not administered by the Department of Agriculture. On July 27, 1923, a World War I minesweeper, brought the Tanager Expedition to Wake Island under the leadership of ornithologist Alexander Wetmore, and a tent camp was established on the eastern end of Wilkes. From July 27 to August 5, the expedition charted the atoll, made extensive zoological and botanical observations and gathered specimens for the Bishop Museum, while the naval vessel under the command of Lt. Cmdr. Samuel Wilder King conducted a sounding survey offshore. Other achievements at Wake included examinations of three abandoned Japanese feather poaching camps, scientific observations of the now extinct Wake Island rail and confirmation that Wake Island is an atoll, with a group comprising three islands with a central lagoon. Wetmore named the southwest island for Charles Wilkes, who had led the original pioneering United States Exploring Expedition to Wake in 1841. The northwest island was named for Titian Peale, the chief naturalist of that 1841 expedition.

Pan American Airways and the U.S. Navy
Juan Trippe, president of the world's then-largest airline, Pan American Airways (PAA), wanted to expand globally by offering passenger air service between the United States and China. To cross the Pacific Ocean his planes would need to island-hop, stopping at various points for refueling and maintenance. He first tried to plot the route on his globe but it showed only open sea between Midway and Guam. Next, he went to the New York Public Library to study 19th-century clipper ship logs and charts and he "discovered" a little-known coral atoll named Wake Island. To proceed with his plans at Wake and Midway, Trippe would need to be granted access to each island and approval to construct and operate facilities; however, the islands were not under the jurisdiction of any specific U.S. government entity.

Meanwhile, U.S. Navy military planners and the State Department were increasingly alarmed by the Empire of Japan's expansionist attitude and growing belligerence in the Western Pacific. Following World War I, the Council of the League of Nations had granted the South Seas Mandate ("Nanyo") to Japan (which had joined the Allied Powers in the First World War) which included the already Japanese-held Micronesia islands north of the equator that were part of the former colony of German New Guinea of the German Empire; these include the modern nation/states of Palau, Federated States of Micronesia, Northern Mariana Islands and Marshall Islands. In the 1920s and 1930s, Japan restricted access to its mandated territory and began to develop harbors and airfields throughout Micronesia in defiance of the Washington Naval Treaty of 1922, which prohibited both the United States and Japan from expanding military fortifications in the Pacific islands. Now with Trippe's planned Pan American Airways aviation route passing through Wake and Midway, the U.S. Navy and the State Department saw an opportunity to project American air power across the Pacific under the guise of a commercial aviation enterprise. On October 3, 1934, Trippe wrote to the Secretary of the Navy, requesting a five-year lease on Wake Island with an option for four renewals. In an attempt to disguise the Navy's military intentions, Rear Admiral Harry E. Yarnell then designated Wake Island as a bird sanctuary.

USS Nitro arrived at Wake Island on March 8, 1935, and conducted a two-day ground, marine and aerial survey, providing the Navy with strategic observations and complete photographic coverage of the atoll. Four days later, on March 12, Secretary of the Navy Claude A. Swanson formally granted Pan American Airways permission to construct facilities at Wake Island.

Pan American "Flying Clippers" base

To construct bases in the Pacific, Pan American Airways (PAA) chartered the 6,700-ton freighter SS North Haven, which arrived at Wake Island on May 9, 1935, with construction workers and the necessary materials and equipment to start to build Pan American facilities and to clear the lagoon for a flying boat landing area. The atoll's encircling coral reef prevented the ship from entering and anchoring in the shallow lagoon itself. The only suitable location for ferrying supplies and workers ashore was at nearby Wilkes Island; however, the chief engineer of the expedition, Charles R. Russell, determined that Wilkes was too low and at times flooded and that Peale Island was the best site for the Pan American facilities. To offload the ship, cargo was lightered (barged) from ship to shore, carried across Wilkes and then transferred to another barge and towed across the lagoon to Peale Island. By inspiration, someone had earlier loaded railroad track rails onto North Haven, so the men built a narrow-gauge railway to make it easier to haul the supplies across Wilkes to the lagoon. The line used a flatbed car pulled by a tractor. On June 12, North Haven departed for Guam, leaving behind various PAA technicians and a construction crew.

On August 17, the first aircraft landing at Wake Island occurred when a PAA flying boat, on a survey flight of the route between Midway and Wake, landed in the lagoon.

The second expedition of North Haven arrived at Wake Island on February 5, 1936, to complete the construction of the PAA facilities. A five-ton diesel locomotive for the Wilkes Island Railroad was offloaded and the railway track was extended to run from dock to dock. Across the lagoon on Peale workers assembled the Pan American Hotel, a prefabricated structure with 48 rooms and wide porches and verandas. The hotel consisted of two wings built out from a central lobby with each room having a bathroom with a hot-water shower. The PAA facilities staff included a group of Chamorro men from Guam who were employed as kitchen helpers, hotel service attendants and laborers. The village on Peale was nicknamed "PAAville" and was the first "permanent" human settlement on Wake.

By October 1936, Pan American Airways was ready to transport passengers across the Pacific on its small fleet of three Martin M-130 "Flying Clippers". On October 11, the China Clipper landed at Wake on a press flight with ten journalists on board. A week later, on October 18, PAA President Juan Trippe and a group of VIP passengers arrived at Wake on the Philippine Clipper (NC14715).  On October 25, the Hawaii Clipper (NC14714) landed at Wake with the first paying airline passengers ever to cross the Pacific. In 1937, Wake Island became a regular stop for PAA's international trans-Pacific passenger and airmail service, with two scheduled flights per week, one westbound from Midway and one eastbound from Guam.

Wake Island is credited with being one of the early successes of hydroponics, which enabled Pan American Airways to grow vegetables for its passengers, as it was very expensive to airlift in fresh vegetables and the island lacked natural soil. Pan Am remained in operation up to the day of the first Japanese air raid in December 1941, forcing the U.S. into World War II.

Military buildup
On February 14, 1941, President Franklin D. Roosevelt issued Executive Order 8682 to create naval defense areas in the central Pacific territories. The proclamation established "Wake Island Naval Defensive Sea Area", which encompassed the territorial waters between the extreme high-water marks and the three-mile marine boundaries surrounding Wake. "Wake Island Naval Airspace Reservation" was also established to restrict access to the airspace over the naval defense sea area. Only U.S. government ships and aircraft were permitted to enter the naval defense areas at Wake Island unless authorized by the Secretary of the Navy.

Just earlier, in January 1941, the United States Navy began construction of a military base on the atoll. On August 19, the first permanent military garrison, elements of the U.S. Marine Corps' First Marine Defense Battalion, totaling 449 officers and men, were stationed on the island, commanded by Navy Cmdr. Winfield Scott Cunningham. Also on the island were 68 U.S. Naval personnel and about 1,221 civilian workers from the American firm Morrison-Knudsen Corp.

World War II

Battle of Wake Island

On December 8, 1941 (December 7 in Hawaii, the day of the attack on Pearl Harbor), at least 27 Japanese Mitsubishi G3M "Nell" medium bombers flown from bases on Kwajalein in the Marshall Islands attacked Wake Island, destroying eight of the 12 Grumman F4F Wildcat fighter aircraft belonging to USMC Fighter Squadron 211 on the ground. The Marine garrison's defensive emplacements were left intact by the raid, which primarily targeted the aircraft.

The garrison – supplemented by civilian construction workers employed by Morrison-Knudsen Corp. – repelled several Japanese landing attempts. An American journalist reported that after the initial Japanese amphibious assault was beaten back with heavy losses on December 11, the American commander was asked by his superiors if he needed anything. Popular legend has it that Major James Devereux sent back the message, "Send us more Japs!" – a reply that became famous. After the war, when Major Devereux learned that he had been credited with sending that message, he pointed out that he had not been the commander on Wake Island and denied sending the message. "As far as I know, it wasn't sent at all. None of us was that much of a damn fool. We already had more Japs than we could handle."
In reality, Commander Winfield S. Cunningham, USN was in charge of Wake Island, not Devereux. Cunningham ordered that coded messages be sent during operations, and a junior officer had added "send us" and "more Japs" to the beginning and end of a message to confuse Japanese code breakers. This was put together at Pearl Harbor and passed on as part of the message.

The U.S. Navy attempted to provide support from Hawaii but had suffered great losses at Pearl Harbor. The relief fleet they managed to organize was delayed by bad weather. The isolated U.S. garrison was overwhelmed by a reinforced and greatly superior Japanese invasion force on December 23. American casualties numbered 52 military personnel (Navy and Marine) and approximately 70 civilians killed. Japanese losses exceeded 700 dead, with some estimates ranging as high as 1,000. Wake's defenders sank two Japanese fast transports (P32 and P33) and one submarine and shot down 24 Japanese aircraft. The relief fleet, en route, on hearing of the island's loss, turned back.

In the aftermath of the battle, most of the captured civilians and military personnel were sent to POW camps in Asia, though some of the civilian laborers were enslaved by the Japanese and tasked with improving the island's defenses.

Japanese occupation and surrender

The island's Japanese garrison was composed of the IJN 65th Guard Unit (2,000 men), Japan Navy Captain Shigematsu Sakaibara and the IJA units which became 13th Independent Mixed Regiment (1,939 men) under command of Col. Shigeji Chikamori. Fearing an imminent invasion, the Japanese reinforced Wake Island with more formidable defenses. The American captives were ordered to build a series of bunkers and fortifications on Wake. The Japanese brought in an  naval gun which is often incorrectly reported as having been captured in Singapore. The U.S. Navy established a submarine blockade instead of an amphibious invasion of Wake Island. The Japanese-occupied island (called Ōtorishima (大鳥島) or Big Bird Island by them for its birdlike shape) was bombed several times by American aircraft; one of these raids was the first mission for future United States President George H. W. Bush.

After a successful American air raid by Task Force 14 on October 5, 1943, Sakaibara ordered the execution of all of the 98 captured Americans who remained on the island. They were taken to the northern end of the island, blindfolded and machine-gunned. One prisoner escaped, carving the message "98 US PW 5-10-43" on a large coral rock near where the victims had been hastily buried in a mass grave. This unknown American was soon recaptured and beheaded.

Since the 1943 air raids, the garrison had been almost cut off from supplies and was reduced to the point of starvation. While the islands' sooty tern colony had received some protection as a source of eggs, the Wake Island rail was hunted to extinction by the starving soldiers. Ultimately about three-quarters of the Japanese garrison perished, and the rest survived only by eating tern eggs, the Polynesian rats introduced by prehistoric voyagers, and what scant amount of vegetables they could grow in makeshift gardens among the coral rubble.

On September 4, 1945, the Japanese garrison surrendered to a detachment of United States Marines under the command of Brigadier General Lawson H. M. Sanderson. The garrison, having previously received news that Imperial Japan's defeat was imminent, exhumed the mass grave. The bones were moved to the U.S. cemetery that had been established on Peacock Point after the invasion. Wooden crosses were erected in preparation for the expected arrival of U.S. forces. During the initial interrogations, the Japanese claimed that the remaining 98 Americans on the island were mostly killed by an American bombing raid, though some escaped and fought to the death after being cornered on the beach at the north end of Wake Island. Several Japanese officers in American custody committed suicide over the incident, leaving written statements that incriminated Sakaibara. Sakaibara and his subordinate, lieutenant commander Tachibana, were later sentenced to death after conviction for this and other war crimes. Sakaibara was executed by hanging in Guam on June 18, 1947, while Tachibana's sentence was commuted to life in prison. The remains of the murdered civilians were exhumed and reburied at Honolulu's National Memorial Cemetery of the Pacific at section G, commonly known as Punchbowl Crater.

Post-World War II military and commercial airfield

With the end of hostilities with Japan and the increase in international air travel driven in part by wartime advances in aeronautics, Wake Island became a critical mid-Pacific base for the servicing and refueling of military and commercial aircraft. The United States Navy resumed control of the island, and in October 1945 400 Seabees from the 85th Naval Construction Battalion arrived at Wake to clear the island of the effects of the war and to build basic facilities for a Naval Air Base. The base was completed in March 1946 and on September 24, regular commercial passenger service was resumed by Pan American Airways (Pan Am). The era of the flying boats was nearly over, so Pan Am switched to longer-range, faster and more profitable airplanes that could land on Wake's new coral runway. Other airlines that established transpacific routes through Wake included British Overseas Airways Corporation (BOAC), Japan Airlines, Philippine Airlines and Transocean Airlines. Due to the substantial increase in the number of commercial flights, on July 1, 1947, the Navy transferred administration, operations and maintenance of the facilities at Wake to the Civil Aeronautics Administration (CAA). In 1949, the CAA upgraded the runway by paving over the coral surface and extending its length to 7,000 feet.

Korean War

In June 1950, the Korean War began with the United States leading United Nations forces against a North Korean invasion of South Korea. In July, the Korean Airlift was started and the Military Air Transport Service (MATS) used the airfield and facilities at Wake as a key mid-Pacific refueling stop for its mission of transporting men and supplies to the Korean front. By September, 120 military aircraft were landing at Wake per day. On October 15, U.S. President Harry S. Truman and General MacArthur met at the Wake Island Conference to discuss progress and war strategy for the Korean Peninsula. They chose to meet at Wake Island because of its close proximity to Korea so that MacArthur would not have to be away from the troops in the field for long.

Missile Impact Location System
From 1958 through 1960 the United States installed the Missile Impact Location System (MILS) in the Navy managed Pacific Missile Range, later the Air Force managed Western Range, to localize the splash downs of test missile nose cones. MILS was developed and installed by the same entities that had completed the first phase of the Atlantic and U.S. West Coast SOSUS systems. A MILS installation, consisting of both a target array for precision location and a broad ocean area system for good positions outside the target area, was installed at Wake as part of the system supporting Intercontinental Ballistic Missile (ICBM) tests. Other Pacific MILS shore terminals were at the Marine Corps Air Station Kaneohe Bay supporting Intermediate Range Ballistic Missile (IRBM) tests with impact areas northeast of Hawaii and the other ICBM test support systems at Midway Island and Eniwetok.

Tanker shipwreck and oil spill
On September 6, 1967, Standard Oil of California's 18,000-ton tanker SS R.C. Stoner was driven onto the reef at Wake Island by a strong southwesterly wind after the ship failed to moor to the two buoys near the harbor entrance. An estimated six million gallons of refined fuel oil – including 5.7 million gallons of aviation fuel, 168,000 gallons of diesel oil and 138,600 gallons of bunker C fuel – spilled into the small boat harbor and along the southwestern coast of Wake Island to Peacock Point. Large numbers of fish were killed by the oil spill, and personnel from the FAA and crewmen from the ship cleared the area closest to the spill of dead fish.

The U.S. Navy salvage team Harbor Clearance Unit Two and Pacific Fleet Salvage Officer Cmdr. At the boat harbor the salvage team pumped and skimmed oil, which they burned each evening in nearby pits. Recovery by the Navy salvage team of the R.C. Stoner and its remaining cargo, however, was hampered by strong winds and heavy seas.

On September 16, Super Typhoon Sarah made landfall on Wake Island at peak intensity with winds up to 145-knots, causing widespread damage. The intensity of the storm had the beneficial effect of greatly accelerating the cleanup effort by clearing the harbor and scouring the coast. Oil did remain, however, embedded in the reef's flat crevices and impregnated in the coral. The storm also had broken the wrecked vessel into three sections and, although delayed by rough seas and harassment by blacktip reef sharks, the salvage team used explosives to flatten and sink the remaining portions of the ship that were still above water.

U.S. Air Force assumes control 
In the early 1970s, higher-efficiency jet aircraft with longer-range capabilities lessened the use of Wake Island Airfield as a refueling stop, and the number of commercial flights landing at Wake declined sharply. Pan Am had replaced many of its Boeing 707s with more efficient 747s, thus eliminating the need to continue weekly stops at Wake. Other airlines began to eliminate their scheduled flights into Wake. In June 1972 the last scheduled Pan Am passenger flight landed at Wake, and in July Pan Am's last cargo flight departed the island, marking the end of the heyday of Wake Island's commercial aviation history. During this same time period the U.S. military had transitioned to longer-range C-5A and C-141 aircraft, leaving the C-130 as the only aircraft that would continue to regularly use the island's airfield. The steady decrease in air traffic control activities at Wake Island was apparent and was expected to continue.

On June 24, 1972, responsibility for the civil administration of Wake Island was transferred from the FAA to the United States Air Force under an agreement between the Secretary of the Interior and the Secretary of the Air Force. In July, the FAA turned over administration of the island to the Military Airlift Command (MAC), although legal ownership stayed with the Department of the Interior, and the FAA continued to maintain the air navigation facilities and provide air traffic control services. On December 27, the Chief of Staff of the Air Force (CSAF) General John D. Ryan directed MAC to phase out en-route support activity at Wake Island effective June 30, 1973. On July 1, 1973, all FAA activities ended and the U.S. Air Force under Pacific Air Forces (PACAF), Detachment 4, 15th Air Base Wing assumed control of Wake Island.

In 1973, Wake Island was selected as a launch site for the testing of defensive systems against intercontinental ballistic missiles under the U.S. Army's Project Have Mill. Air Force personnel on Wake and the Air Force Systems Command (AFSC) Space and Missile Systems Organization (SAMSO) provided support to the Army's Advanced Ballistic Missile Defense Agency (ABMDA). A missile launch complex was activated on Wake and, from February 13 to June 22, 1974, seven Athena H missiles were launched from the island to the Roi-Namur Test Range at Kwajalein Atoll.

Vietnam War refugees and Operation New Life

In the spring of 1975, the population of Wake Island consisted of 251 military, government and civilian contract personnel, whose primary mission was to maintain the airfield as a Mid-Pacific emergency runway. With the imminent fall of Saigon to North Vietnamese forces, President Gerald Ford ordered American forces to support Operation New Life, the evacuation of refugees from Vietnam. The original plans included the Philippines' Subic Bay and Guam as refugee processing centers, but due to the high number of Vietnamese seeking evacuation, Wake Island was selected as an additional location.

In March 1975, Island Commander Major Bruce R. Hoon was contacted by Pacific Air Forces (PACAF) and ordered to prepare Wake for its new mission as a refugee processing center where Vietnamese evacuees could be medically screened, interviewed and transported to the United States or other resettlement countries. A 60-man civil engineering team was brought in to reopen boarded-up buildings and housing, two complete MASH units arrived to set up field hospitals and three Army field kitchens were deployed. A 60-man United States Air Force Security Police team, processing agents from the U.S. Immigration and Naturalization Service and various other administrative and support personnel were also on Wake. Potable water, food, medical supplies, clothing and other supplies were shipped in.

On April 26, 1975, the first C-141 military transport aircraft carrying refugees arrived. The airlift to Wake continued at a rate of one C-141 every hour and 45 minutes, each aircraft with 283 refugees on board. At the peak of the mission, 8,700 Vietnamese refugees were on Wake. When the airlift ended on August 2, a total of about 15,000 refugees had been processed through Wake Island as part of Operation New Life.

Bikini Islanders resettlement
On March 20, 1978, Undersecretary James A. Joseph of the U.S. Department of the Interior reported that radiation levels from Operation Crossroads and other atomic tests conducted in the 1940s and 1950s on Bikini Atoll were still too high and those island natives that returned to Bikini would once again have to be relocated. In September 1979 a delegation from the Bikini/Kili Council came to Wake Island to assess the island's potential as a possible resettlement site. The delegation also traveled to Hawaii (Molokai and Hilo), Palmyra Atoll and various atolls in the Marshall Islands including Mili, Knox, Jaluit, Ailinglaplap, Erikub and Likiep but the group agreed that they were only interested in resettlement on Wake Island due to the presence of the U.S. military and the island's proximity to Bikini Atoll. Unfortunately for the Bikini Islanders, the U.S. Department of Defense responded that "any such resettlement is out of the question".

Commemorative and memorial visits
In April 1981, a party of 19 Japanese, including 16 former Japanese soldiers who were at Wake during World War II, visited the island to pay respects for their war dead at the Japanese Shinto Shrine.

In the early 1980s, the National Park Service conducted an evaluation of Wake Island to determine if the World War II (WWII) cultural resources remaining on Wake, Wilkes and Peale were of national historical significance. As a result of this survey, Wake Island was designated as a National Historic Landmark (NHL) on September 16, 1985, helping to preserve sites and artifacts on the atoll associated with WWII in the Pacific and the transpacific aviation era prior to the war. As a National Historic Landmark, Wake Island was also included in the National Register of Historic Places.

On November 3 and 4, 1985, a group of 167 former American prisoners of war (POWs) visited Wake with their wives and children. This was the first such visit by a group of former Wake Island POWs and their families.

On November 24, 1985, a Pan American Airlines (Pan Am) Boeing 747, renamed China Clipper II, came through Wake Island on a flight across the Pacific to commemorate the 50th anniversary of the inauguration of Pan American China Clipper Service to the Orient. Author James A. Michener and Lars Lindbergh, grandson of aviator Charles Lindbergh, were among the dignitaries on board the aircraft.

Army missile tests
Subsequently, the island has been used for strategic defense and operations during and after the Cold War, with Wake Island serving as a launch platform for military rockets involved in testing missile defense systems and atmospheric re-entry trials as part of the Ronald Reagan Ballistic Missile Defense Test Site.  Wake's location allows for a safe launch and trajectory over the unpopulated ocean with open space for intercepts.

In 1987, Wake Island was selected as a missile launch site for a Strategic Defense Initiative (SDI) program named Project Starlab/Starbird. In 1989, the U.S. Army Strategic Defense Command (USASDC) constructed two launch pads on Peacock Point, as well as nearby support facilities, for the eight-ton, multi-stage Starbird test missiles. The program involved using electro-optical and laser systems, mounted on the Starlab platform in the payload bay of an orbiting Space Shuttle, to acquire, track and target Starbird missiles launched from Cape Canaveral and Wake. After being impacted by mission scheduling delays caused by the explosion of the Space Shuttle Challenger, the program was canceled in late September 1990 to protect funding for another U.S. Army space-based missile defense program known as Brilliant Pebbles. Although no Starbird missiles were ever launched from Wake Island, the Starbird launch facilities at Wake were modified to support rocket launches for the Brilliant Pebbles program with the first launch occurring on January 29, 1992. On October 16, a  Castor-Orbus rocket was destroyed by ground controllers seven minutes after its launch from Wake. The program was canceled in 1993.

Missile testing activities continued with the Lightweight Exo-Atmospheric Projectile (LEAP) Test Program, another U.S. Army strategic defense project that included the launching of two Aerojet Super Chief HPB rockets from Wake Island.

Due to the U.S. Army's continued use of the atoll for various missile testing programs, on October 1, 1994, the U.S. Army Space and Strategic Defense Command (USASSDC) assumed administrative command of Wake Island under a caretaker permit from the U.S. Air Force. The USASSDC had been operating on Wake since 1988 when construction of Starbird launch and support facilities was started.

In July 1995, various units of the U.S. military established a camp on Wake Island to provide housing, food, medical care and social activities for Chinese illegal immigrants as part of Operation Prompt Return (also known as Joint Task Force Prompt Return). The Chinese immigrants were discovered on July 3 on board the M/V Jung Sheng Number 8 when the 160-foot-long vessel was interdicted by the U.S. Coast Guard south of Hawaii. The Jung Sheng had left Canton, China en route to the United States on June 2 with 147 Chinese Illegal Immigrants, including 18 "enforcers", and 11 crew on board. On July 29, the Chinese were transported to Wake Island where they were cared for by U.S. military personnel and on August 7, they were safely repatriated to China by commercial air charter. From October 10 to November 21, 1996, military units assigned to Operation Marathon Pacific used facilities at Wake Island as a staging area for the repatriation of another group of more than 113 Chinese illegal immigrants who had been interdicted in the Atlantic Ocean near Bermuda aboard the human smuggling vessel, the Xing Da.

U.S. Air Force regains control
On October 1, 2002, administrative control and support of Wake Island was transferred from the U.S. Army to the U.S. Air Force's 15th Wing, an aviation unit of Pacific Air Forces based at Hickam Air Force Base in Hawaii. The 15th Wing had previously been in control of Wake from July 1, 1973, to September 30, 1994. Although the Air Force was once again in control, the Missile Defense Agency would continue to operate the Wake Island Launch Center and the U.S. Army's Ronald Reagan Ballistic Missile Defense Test Site would continue to maintain and operate the launch facilities and also provide instrumentation, communications, flight and ground safety, security, and other support.

On January 6, 2009, President George W. Bush issued Executive Order 8836, establishing Pacific Remote Islands Marine National Monument to preserve the marine environments around Wake, Baker, Howland, and Jarvis Islands, Johnston Atoll, Kingman Reef, and Palmyra Atoll. The proclamation assigned management of the nearby waters and submerged and emergent lands of the islands to the Department of the Interior and management of fishery-related activities in waters beyond 12 nautical miles from the islands' mean low water line to the National Oceanic and Atmospheric Administration (NOAA). On January 16, Secretary of the Interior Dirk Kempthorne issued Order Number 3284 which stated that the area at Wake Island assigned to the Department of Interior by Executive Order 8836 will be managed as a National Wildlife Refuge. Management of the emergent lands at Wake Island by the U.S. Fish and Wildlife Service, however, will not begin until the existing management agreement between the Secretary of the Air Force and the Secretary of the Interior is terminated.

The 611th Air Support Group (ASG), a U.S. Air Force unit based at Joint Base Elmendorf-Richardson in Anchorage, Alaska took over control of Wake Island from the 15th Wing On October 1, 2010. The 611th ASG was already providing support and management to various geographically remote Air Force sites within Alaska and the addition of Wake Island provided the unit with more opportunities for outdoor projects during the winter months when projects in Alaska are very limited. The 611th ASG, a unit of the 11th Air Force, was renamed the Pacific Air Forces (PACAF) Regional Support Center.

On September 27, 2014, President Barack Obama issued Executive Order 9173 to expand the area of the Pacific Remote Islands Marine National Monument out to the full 200 nautical miles U.S. exclusive economic zone (EEZ) boundary for each island. By this proclamation, the area of the monument at Wake Island was increased from 15,085 sq mi (39,069 km2) to 167,336 sq mi (433,398 km2).

On November 1, 2015, a complex $230 million U.S. military missile defense system test event, called Campaign Fierce Sentry Flight Test Operational-02 Event 2 (FTO-02 E2), was conducted at Wake Island and the surrounding ocean areas. The test involved a Terminal High Altitude Area Defense (THAAD) system built by Lockheed Martin, two AN/TPY-2 radar systems built by Raytheon, Lockheed's Command, Control, Battle Management, and Communications system, and  guided missile destroyer with its AN/SPY-1 radar. The objective was to test the ability of the Aegis Ballistic Missile Defense and THAAD Weapon Systems to defeat a raid of three near-simultaneous air and missile targets, consisting of one medium-range ballistic missile, one short-range ballistic missile and one cruise missile target. During the test, a THAAD system on Wake Island detected and destroyed a short-range target simulating a short-range ballistic missile that was launched by a C-17 transport plane. At the same time, the THAAD system and the destroyer both launched missiles to intercept a medium-range ballistic missile, launched by a second C-17.

Demographics
Wake Island has no permanent inhabitants and access is restricted. However, as of 2017, there are approximately 100 Air Force personnel and American and Thai contractor residents at any given time. As of 2011, the billeting at the airfield supports 198 beds.

Government

On June 24, 1972, the United States Air Force assumed responsibility for the civil administration of Wake Island pursuant to an agreement between the Department of the Interior and the Department of the Air Force.

The civil administration authority at Wake Island has been delegated by the Secretary of the Air Force to the General Counsel of the Air Force under U.S. federal law known as the Wake Island Code. The general counsel provides civil, legal and judicial authority and can appoint one or more judges to serve on the Wake Island Court and the Wake Island Court of Appeals.

Certain authorities have been re-delegated by the general counsel to the Commander, Wake Island, a position currently held by Commander, Detachment 1, Pacific Air Forces Regional Support Center. The commander may issue permits or registrations, appoint peace officers, impose quarantines, issue traffic regulations, commission notaries public, direct evacuations and inspections and carry out other duties, powers, and functions as the agent of the general counsel on Wake.

Since Wake Island is an active Air Force airfield, the commander is also the senior officer in charge of all activities on the island.

Transportation

Aviation
Air transportation facilities at Wake are operated by the United States Air Force at Wake Island Airfield in support of trans-Pacific military operations, western Pacific military contingency operations and missile launch activities. The  runway on Wake is also available to provide services for military and commercial in-flight emergencies. Although there is only one flight scheduled every other week to transport passengers and cargo to Wake, approximately 600 aircraft per year use Wake Island Airfield.

Ports
Although Wake Island is supplied by sea-going barges and ships, the island's only harbor between Wilkes and Wake is too narrow and shallow for sea-going vessels to enter. The Base Operations Support (BOS) contractor maintains three small landing barges for transferring material from ships moored offshore to the dockyard in the harbor. Off-load hydrants are also used to pump gasoline and JP-5 fuels to the storage tanks on Wilkes. The landing barges and recreational offshore sportfishing boats are docked in the marina.

Roads
Transportation on Wake Island is provided by contractors or government-owned vehicles. The primary road is a two-lane paved road extending the length of Wake Island to the causeway between Wake Island and Wilkes Island. The causeway was rehabilitated in 2003 and is capable of supporting heavy equipment. A bridge connecting Wake and Peale Islands burned down in December 2002. A combination of paved and coral gravel roads serves the marina area. Paved access to Wilkes Island ends at the petroleum tank farm, where a road constructed of crushed coral provides access to the western point of Wilkes Island. A portion of the road, near the unfinished WWII submarine channel, is flooded nearly every year by high seas. The launch sites are accessed from the main paved road on Wake Island by paved and coral roads. Generally, the road network is suitable for low-speed, light-duty use only. Wake Island's paved roadway network has been adequately maintained to move materials, services, and personnel from the airfield on the southern end to the personnel support area on the northern end. Modes of transportation include walking, bicycles, light utility carts, automobiles, vans and larger trucks and equipment.

Territorial claim by the Marshall Islands

The Republic of the Marshall Islands has claimed Wake Island, which it calls Ānen Kio (new orthography) or Enen-kio (old orthography). In 1973, Marshallese lawmakers meeting in Saipan at the Congress of Micronesia, the legislative body for the Trust Territory of the Pacific Islands, asserted that "Enen-kio is and always has been the property of the people of the Marshall Islands". Their claim was based on oral legends and songs, passed down through generations, describing ancient Marshallese voyages to Wake to gather food and a sacred bird's wing bone used in traditional tattooing ceremonies. In 1990, legislation in the U.S. Congress proposed including Wake Island within the boundaries of the U.S. territory of Guam. In response, Marshallese President Amata Kabua reasserted his nation's claim to Wake, declaring that Enen-kio was a site of great importance to the traditional chiefly rituals of the Marshall Islands.

The self-declared Kingdom of EnenKio has also claimed Wake Island as a separate sovereign nation and has issued passports. The Kingdom of EnenKio is not recognized in any international forum as a sovereign state, nor does any internationally recognized state recognize it. The Kingdom of EnenKio is characterized as a scam by anti-fraud website Quatloos!. In 2000, Robert Moore, who claimed to be the head of state, was prevented by the U.S. Securities and Exchange Commission from fraudulently issuing bonds for the non-existent nation. On April 23, 1998, the Marshall Islands government notified all countries with which it has diplomatic ties that the claims of the Kingdom of EnenKio are fraudulent.

References

Further reading

External links

 Wake Atoll National Wildlife Refuge
 Wake Island – Pacific Wreck Database
 
 
 Current Weather, Wake Island
 AirNav – Wake Island Airfield – Airport details, facilities and navigational aids
 Rocket launches at Wake Island
 The Defense of Wake – United States Marine Corps historical monograph
 Surrender of Wake by the Japanese – Marines in World War II
 U.S. Army Strategic and Missile Defense Command – Logistics, flight schedules, facilities (archived – snapshot at December 8, 2016)
 Photographic history of the 1975 Vietnamese refugee camp on Wake Island
 Australia-Oceania: Wake Island – CIA: Library – Publications – The World Factbook 

 
Geography of Micronesia
Islands of Oceania
International territorial disputes of the United States
Pacific Ocean atolls of the United States
Pacific Remote Islands Marine National Monument
Protected areas established in 2009
Territorial disputes of the Marshall Islands
United States Minor Outlying Islands
World War II on the National Register of Historic Places
National Historic Landmarks of the United States by insular area
Seabees
Pacific islands of the United States
Important Bird Areas of United States Minor Outlying Islands
Important Bird Areas of Oceania
Seabird colonies